Priboj is a municipality and town in Serbia.

Priboj may also refer to:

Priboj, Leskovac
Priboj, Vladičin Han

People with the surname
István Priboj (died 1957), Hungarian and Slovak footballer and manager

See also
Pribojevići, village in Bosnia and Herzegovina
Priboj City Stadium